Joanna Roth (born Joanna Angelis in 1965) is a Danish-British actress. She trained at the Royal Academy of Dramatic Art (RADA) and has appeared in film, TV, video games and theatre, in roles such as Ophelia in the film Rosencrantz & Guildenstern Are Dead.

She is married to the Scottish actor John Hannah. She appeared with her husband in the BBC One drama series New Street Law, ITV's Rebus, the film Sliding Doors, and onstage at London's Bush Theatre in A Bright Light Shining. She provided the voice of Aveline Vallen in Dragon Age II.

Filmography

Film

Television

Video game

References

1965 births
British film actresses
British television actresses
British video game actresses
Shakespearean actresses
Danish film actresses
Danish television actresses
Danish video game actresses
Royal Shakespeare Company members
Alumni of RADA
Living people
British stage actresses
Danish emigrants to England
People from Aarhus